Antena 3 may refer to:
Antena 3 (Portugal), a national radio channel produced by the Portuguese public broadcasting entity Rádio e Televisão de Portugal
Antena 3 (Romania), a Romanian television channel owned by Intact Media Group
Antena 3 (Spanish TV channel), a television channel
Antena 3 Canarias, a defunct television channel that broadcasts to the Canary Islands
Antena 3 Noticias, a news program
Antena 3 Radio, defunct radio station

See also
 Antenna 3 (disambiguation)